Inverness and Nairn is a constituency of the Scottish Parliament (Holyrood) covering  part of the Highland council area. It elects one Member of the Scottish Parliament (MSP) by the first past the post method of election. It is also one of eight constituencies in the Highlands and Islands electoral region, which elects seven additional members, to produce a form of proportional representation for the region as a whole.

The seat was first created for the 2011 Scottish Parliament election, and covers parts of the former seats of Inverness East, Nairn & Lochaber and Ross, Skye & Inverness West. Since being formed it has been held by Fergus Ewing of the Scottish National Party, who was previously the member for Inverness East, Nairn and Lochaber.

Electoral region 

The Inverness and Nairn constituency is part of  the Highlands and Islands electoral region; the other seven constituencies are Argyll and Bute, Caithness, Sutherland and Ross, Moray, Na h-Eileanan an Iar, Orkney, Shetland and Skye, Lochaber and Badenoch.

The region covers most of Argyll and Bute council area, all of the Highland council area, most of the Moray council area, all of the Orkney Islands council area, all of the Shetland Islands council area and all of Na h-Eileanan Siar.

Constituency boundaries and council area 

The Highland (council area) is represented in the Scottish Parliament by three constituencies. These are: Caithness, Sutherland and Ross; Inverness and Nairn and Skye, Lochaber and Badenoch.

The electoral wards used to create the new Inverness and Nairn seat are:

In full: Inverness West; Inverness Central; Inverness Ness-Side; Inverness Millburn; Inverness South; Culloden and Ardersier; Nairn and Cawdor
In part: Badenoch and Strathspey

Member of the Scottish Parliament

Election results

2020s

2010s

Notes and references

External links

Highland constituencies, Scottish Parliament
Scottish Parliament constituencies and regions from 2011
Constituencies of the Scottish Parliament
2011 establishments in Scotland
Constituencies established in 2011
Inverness
County of Nairn
Grantown-on-Spey